Ruslan Shamilevich Alikhadzhiev was a parliamentary speaker of the Chechen Republic of Ichkeria who was forcibly disappeared by Russian forces in 2000.

Life
Alikhadzhiev was born in 1961 and fought in the First Chechen War as a field commander. In the years 1997-1999 he was the Chairman of the Parliament of the Chechen Republic of Ichkeria. During the Second Chechen War he did not take an active part in hostilities and instead sought a negotiated end to the war on behalf of Chechen President Aslan Maskhadov.

Forced disappearance
On 17 May 2000, Alikhadzhiev was detained by a large group of uniformed Russian soldiers who arrived by armoured vehicles and helicopters at his home in Shali. Alikhadzhiyev, who was with his four minor children and was caring for a sick mother, did not resist; he was handcuffed, blindfolded and taken by an armoured vehicle to a location nearby, which is where he was last seen. Five more men were detained with him at the other locations in Shali this night, but they were all released the next day. On 25 May, Colonel General Valery Manilov confirmed the arrest during a press conference, and on 1 August the state news agency RIA Novosti announced that "Ruslan Alikhadzhiev, one of the closest allies of Maskhadov, was captured in a special operation by the FSB."

In September 2000, Maskhadov's Chechenpress service claimed Alikhadzhiev was tortured to death in the Moscow's Lefortovo prison; AFP, citing sources close to the Chechen leadership, reported that Alikhadzhiyev had died of a heart attack in the Lefortovo. However, the FSB, which operates Lefortovo, denied that it is holding Alikhadzhiyev. On 21 September 2000, Yuri Biryukov, the Senior Deputy Prosecutor General of the Russian Federation, said answering to a question asked in the Russian State Duma regarding the whereabouts of Alikhadzhiev that he was killed in August by "the same group of unknown armed people" that had abducted him. A Shalinsky District's prosecutor's office said it opened a case for kidnapping, but "the steps taken to identify the individuals responsible for this crime have been unsuccessful" and the investigation was suspended on 12 December 2000. The case of disappearance and presumed death of Alikhadzhiyev was used by Sergei Kovalev in his defense of Akhmed Zakayev, Maskhadov's envoy on Europe, before the British extradition court in 2003; Zakayev was soon granted a political asylum in Britain.

In July 2007, in the case Alikhadzhieva v Russia, the European Court of Human Rights found Russian authorities responsible for the "disappearance" and presumed killing of Alikhadzhiev and ordered the government to pay his mother 40,000 euros ($54,500) in damages.

References

External links
Russia May Be Charged with the Abduction of Ichkerian Parliament Speaker, Kommersant, 21 December 2005
Russia Found Guilty of Murder, Kommersant, 6 July 2007
Russia 'ordered murder of Chechen moderate', The Daily Telegraph,  7 July 2007

1961 births
2000 deaths
Article 2 of the European Convention on Human Rights
Chechen field commanders
Chechen murder victims
Chechen nationalists
Chechen politicians
Chechen victims of human rights abuses
European Court of Human Rights cases involving Russia
People of the Chechen wars
Politicians of Ichkeria
Prisoners who died in Russian detention
Russian torture victims
Chechen warlords
Russian people of Chechen descent
Chechen people
North Caucasian independence activists